Clear Airport  is a state-owned public-use airport located three nautical miles (6 km) southeast of the central business district of Clear, Alaska, United States.

Facilities and aircraft 
It has one runway designated 1/19 with a 4,000 by 100 ft (1,219 x 30 m) asphalt pavement.

For the 12-month period ending December 31, 2005, the airport had 2,000 aircraft operations, an average of 166 per month: 75% general aviation and 25% military. At that time there were 12 aircraft based at this airport, all single-engine.

References

External links 
 FAA Alaska airport diagram (GIF)

Airports in Denali Borough, Alaska